Edwin J. Prindle (1868-1948) contributed to the development of the current U.S. patent law system. He worked in the US Patent Office until 1899, then set up his own patent practice in 1905. Held posts of the Secretary of the Patent Committee of the National Research Council and later Chairman of the Patent Committee of the American Chemical Society.

He wrote a number of documents on the subject of patent law, most notably a set of articles entitled "Patents in Manufacturing Business". These formed the ideological basis for companies' use of the patent system as a protectionist tool of private research and development. He was an advocate of the patent system in general, but most notably as a fundamental tool of business and corporate control over rivals.

References 

1948 deaths
United States patent law
1868 births